Souvenaid is a medical food in the form of a thick, yogurt-like drink that is marketed as helping people with Alzheimer's disease.  It contains a mixture of docosahexaenoic acid, eicosapentaenoic acid, phospholipids, choline, uridine monophosphate, vitamin E (alpha-tocopherol equivalents), selenium, vitamin B12, vitamin B6, and folic acid; this mixture is branded as Fortasyn Connect.  As of 2017, the product had failed to show a significant effect in decreasing the rate of cognitive decline or delaying progression of Alzheimer's disease, but appeared to cause minor improvement in verbal memory in some people in the very early stages of the disease. The clinical trials that had been conducted were in people with very early Alzheimer's disease and excluded people who ate recommended amounts of food that included fish oil. As of 2020, more promise has been shown for the effect of Fortasyn Connect through the LipiDidi study with regards to the improvement of cognitive decline in early stages of the progression of dementia. The multinutrient intervention slowed decline of measures related to cognition, function, brain atrophy, and disease progression.

Souvenaid was originally created by the Dutch company Numico Research, which was acquired by Danone (Dannon in the US) in 2007 and is marketed by Nutricia, a division of Danone.  The product is based in part on basic research work done by Richard Wurtman at Massachusetts Institute of Technology, and MIT and Harvard patented the mixture and licensed the patent to the company.  The theory behind the ingredients included in Souvenaid is that they are components or precursors to components of synaptic membranes, the theory that problems with synapse formation are part of the pathology of Alzheimer's disease, and the idea that these problems might be caused or exacerbated by a lack of those components in the diets of people who develop Alzheimer's disease.

As of 2013 it was marketed through pharmacies in Brazil, the Netherlands, Belgium, Germany, Italy, the UK, and Australia.  In the UK pharmacists have to undergo a training course and take an online test from the manufacturer before they can sell it.

In January 2014, the French regulatory authorities rejected the manufacturer's proposed marketing claims on the basis that target population and its nutritional needs were not well defined and the statistically weak data in the evidence provided.

References 

Antidementia agents
Alzheimer's disease
Medical food